The 2011 FORU Oceania Cup for national rugby union teams in the Oceania region was held in Papua New Guinea at the Lloyd Robson Oval in Port Moresby from  29 November to 3 December.

Papua New Guinea won the cup, retaining their title from 2009, by winning the round-robin tournament over Vanuatu, Solomon Islands, and Niue.


Round-robin tournament

See also
 FORU Oceania Cup

Reference list

2011
2011 rugby union tournaments for national teams
2011 in Oceanian rugby union
International rugby union competitions hosted by Papua New Guinea